Baler is a 2008 historical-romantic epic film and the official entry of VIVA Films in the 2008 Metro Manila Film Festival, starring Anne Curtis and Jericho Rosales. Its first screening was on December 25, 2008, simultaneously with the rest of the 2008 Metro Manila Film Festival film entries.

Storyline
Set in the late 19th century, this historical fiction is based on the siege of Baler, an event that occurs in the Philippines that begins on July 1, 1898 and lasts up to June 2, 1899.

The film's two main characters are fictional, their stories interweave with real historical figures and events of the 337-day siege of Baler. Baler, Aurora is located on the eastern coast of Luzon, a remote and virtually isolated town reachable only by sea or by foot through difficult jungle terrain. It is not surprising that news does not travel quickly to this part of the islands.

As real events of the siege unfold, the film follows the fictional love story of Celso Resurrección (Jericho Rosales), a Spanish mestizo soldier, and Feliza Reyes (Anne Curtis), a local maiden and daughter of a Katipunero, with their relationship caught in the middle of the Philippine Revolution. Celso, a half-Filipino, half-Spaniard, joins the Spanish Army hoping he is sent to Spain after the war so he can search for his soldier father who he hasn't seen since his father was sent back to their motherland. Celso meets Feliza while assigned to the Baler regiment and they fall in love.

In June, a month before the siege, the first Philippine Republic President Emilio Aguinaldo and Filipino revolutionists actively attack the Americans. Filipino soldiers who resist are arrested and both sides actively engage.

Baler is isolated from current news with no inkling they lost the war. Baler is guarded by a fifty seven-man detachment of the 2nd Expeditionary Battalion of Spanish "Cazadores" under Captain Enrique de las Morenas Fossí, the Principe district political-military governor, including three "Indios" and Celso, the Mestizo. In June, de Las Morenas tasks his Cazadores to stock food supplies and ammunition and fortify the church compound of San Luís de Tolosa in Baler's town square against a possible attack from the revolutionary army. The church was the only stone building in the area.

In the midst of the uneasy quiet, Celso and Feliza enjoy their love affair, a relationship they keep secret. But military conflict escalates and rumors of an upcoming battle is confirmed when the town residents leave their homes.

On June 30, 800 Filipino troops under Colonels Calixto Villacorte and Teodorico Luna attack the garrison and the Spaniards take shelter in the church as they had planned. The town priest, Padre Candido Gómez Carreño, stays with them in the church. Gabriel Reyes, Feliza's brother, leaves his family to join Father Gomez as his sacristan. Gabriel desires to become a priest to the disappointment of his father.

Moreno's detachment of the 2nd Expeditionary Battalion is unaware that the war is over. He prepares to defend Baler town against the Filipino forces. He is confident that reinforcements will come. Celso is one of the fifty seven Cazadores hunkering down in the church, a mestizo, one of four soldiers in the Spanish regiment with native ties. Celso's mother is a Filipina. Celso recognizes Gabriel and urges him to leave the Church because of the danger they face, but Gabriel is convinced that his Christian duty is to stay and help the Padre. He also believes that his presence would hold back the Filipinos from storming the church. The Spaniards  allow him to stay but tells him he can leave if he chooses to.

Outside the church, Feliza's distraught father runs to the town square fronting the Church and implores his son to leave the church but Gabriel is resolute in his decision.

Over the coming weeks, several attempts are made by the Filipinos to get the Spaniards to surrender, promising them safe conduct. They offer a full day suspension of hostilities which both camps accept to give both parties time to bury their casualties and the Spaniards the opportunity to assess the reality of their situation.

The Spaniards endure the deteriorating conditions inside the church. As months pass, the hot climate spoils their food supply, and the soldiers risk getting shot at when they forage at night for fruits, berries and various herbs. One night, the Captain orders Celso and another Filipino Cazadore on a foray to burn nearby houses to distract the Filipinos and show them that their spirits are not broken. Celso takes this opportunity to see Feliza. She gets the chance to hand him a potful of food from the town fiesta held earlier that day in the town square as a ploy to entice the Spaniards to give up.

The women townsfolk complain to the Filipino leaders that they have not heard mass in months. Succumbing to pressure, the Filipinos request the Spaniards to cease hostilities for an hour to allow Padre Gomez to say mass outside the church. The Spaniards agree. The townsfolk and the Reyes family are happy to see their son Gabriel for the first time since the siege while he assists the priest as the sacristan. While the townsfolk worship outside, the Spaniards worship inside the church. Unfortunately, weakened and ill from the deteriorating conditions inside the church, Padre Gomez dies before the mass is finished, and the temporary ceasefire ends as soldiers bring the priest back inside and the fighting resumes. At this point, Celso and the Spaniards urge Manuel to leave the church and he agrees. As Gabriel leaves the church, his family rush to greet him. And contrary to what Gabriel expects, his father breaks down and embraces him.

A brief respite comes on Christmas Day. As Feliza's family enjoy their Christmas Eve feast (the traditional "Noche Buena"), a carabao is spotted in front of the church door, a stray perhaps or a present from the townsfolk. The Spaniards enjoy a hearty Christmas meal and a boost of food provisions that last a few days.

Although the soldiers suffer casualties from the gunshots, diseases such as beriberi and dysentery claim many lives and weaken the survivors. In September, their commanding officer Captain de Las Morenas succumbs to beriberi. Command falls to Lt. Saturnino Martín Cerezo when Las Morenas dies in December.

Several efforts to entice the Spaniards to surrender fail. To convince them that the war is over, the Filipinos leave newspapers on the church steps which reports Spain's planned departure from the Philippines and the Spanish–American War is over. They bring in Spanish civilians, a uniformed Spanish officer who advises Lt. Martin that Spain's affairs in the Philippines is closing. Lt. Martin refuses to believe them. His leadership is strong and the emaciated soldiers remain loyal to him.

Lt. Martin is as stubborn as his predecessor, convinced that reinforcements are coming, and indeed they would have been rescued by the Americans.

Their food runs out in April, and the Spaniards resort to eating stray dogs, reptiles, snails and crows. Weak as they were, they capably defend their post from their advantageous positions that provides them view of their targets. In the town's only tall structure, their riflemen easily picks off Filipino soldiers coming within their view.

That same month, the Americans send Commander Charles S. Sperry, commanding the USS Yorktown, to rescue the Spaniards. The Philippines has been at war with the United States since February. No longer allies, the Filipinos get wind of the planned mission. They intercept the Americans and prevent the rescue, killing Americans and capturing others. The failed reinforcement efforts damage the Spaniards' morale and a few plan to escape.  Celso is one of them, especially when he learns a few months back, that Feliza is expecting their child. At one of their public exchange of information, Feliza and Celso act as emissaries for each camp. She furtively passes on a letter to Celso telling him she is pregnant. At the time of Celso's desertion, he is unaware that Feliza has given birth to his son who names him Celso Resurreción Jr.

On the night of the desertion, three Filipino natives and three Spaniards including Celso, escape their posts while everyone is asleep. The sound of the doorlatch opening awakens Lt. Martin and he catches Celso and Mauro (one of the Indios serving in the Spanish detachment) about to escape. Fearful of being shot by Lt. Martin, Mauro accuses Celso of aiding the desertion of the three Spanish soldiers who escape. Lt. Martin orders Celso's execution on June 1, 1899, the day before the surrender.

That evening, Martín reads an article concerning a close friend's posting, plans of which only he knew, which convinces him the newspapers are genuine and that Spain lost the war. The next day, he assembles his men and informs them of his discovery that Spain did lose the war. On June 2, 1899, Lt. Martin Corezco and his troops surrender to the Philippine Republic Army led by Lt. Coronel Simón Ocampo Tecson.

As Martín formally signs the surrender papers in front of the townsfolk of Baler, Feliza scans the faces of the emaciated and skeletal soldiers, who despite their conditions stand brave and proud in formation, but she does not see Celso. She runs inside the church and finds his lifeless body in the baptistry of the church. He is bound and shot through the heart.

Of the fifty seven men who entered the church of Baler on June 27, 1898, thirty-five survive the siege that lasted for 337 days.

Post credits at the end of the film says that Lt. Saturnino Martin-Corezco was promoted to Major. He was decorated with the Royal Cross of the Military Order of San Fernando, and went on to become a Major General. He died in 1948.

Over 9,000 Spanish soldiers surrendered to the Philippine Republic Army, even before the mock "Battle of Manila Bay" of May 1, 1898.

Celso Resurrection Jr. grew up in Baler and served in the Philippine Army during World War II. He died in 1980.

A declaration of resistance against Spanish colonial rule which began with the Cry of Baler in September 1897 is where the last Spanish garrison in the Philippines surrendered after the siege of Baler on June 2, 1899, effectively ending 333 years of Spanish rule in the country.

Release
Baler has been available on original CD and DVD since March 17, 2009.

Baler had a special screening at the 2nd San Joaquin International Film Festival, on May 19, 2009 in Stockton, California.

Cast
 Anne Curtis as Feliza Reyes
 Jericho Rosales as Celso Resurrección
 Phillip Salvador as Daniel Reyes
 Andrew Schimmer as Lt. José Mota
 Baron Geisler as Capt. Enrique Fossí de las Morenas
 Ryan Eigenmann as 2nd Lt. Saturnino Martín Cerezo                          
 Carlo Aquino as Gabriel Reyes
 Nikki Bacolod as Luming                                                                                       
 Mark Bautista as Lope Balbuena
 Joe Goodall as American Soldier
 Jeremiah Rosales as Jaime Caldenay
 Lindley Lumantas as Ilong
 Joel Torre as Commandante Teodorico Luna Novicio
 Alvin Anson as Catalán
 Mark Lagang as Alom
 Michael de Mesa as Fr. Candido Gómez Carreno
 Rio Locsin as Azón Reyes
 John Richards as American Captain
 Johnny Solomon as Emilio Aguinaldo
 DJ Durano as Pablo/Ambo
 Leo Martinez as Col. Calixto Villacorte
 Bernard Palanca as Lt. Juan Alonzo Zayas
 Miguel Gonzales as Celso Reyes Resurreción, Jr.
 Jao Mapa as Mauro
 Mikel Campos as Flag Bearer
 Spyke Perez
 Vince Edwards
 Billy Ray Afable
 Alan Pérez
 Allen Dizon as Lt. Col. Simón Tecson (uncredited)
 Marc Vautrin as Spanish Soldier (uncredited)

Awards
2008 Metro Manila Film Festival

2009 Gawad Genio Awards

2009 FAMAS Awards

2009 FAP Awards

Controversy
On February 25, 2013, Ombudsman Conchita Carpio-Morales ordered the indictment of former Philippine Amusement and Gaming Corporation (PAGCOR) chairman Efraim Genuino, his son Erwin, and six other officials of the state-run gaming firm for malversation and graft charges in connection to a multimillion-peso deal for Baler.

See also
Last Stand in the Philippines – 1945 Spanish film
1898, Our Last Men in the Philippines – 2016 Spanish film

References

External links
 

2008 films
2008 romantic drama films
2000s war drama films
Spanish–American War films
Films set during the Philippine–American War
Films set in the Philippines
Philippine romantic drama films
Philippine war drama films
Viva Films films
Films set in Aurora (province)
Films shot in Aurora (province)
Films directed by Mark Meily